Myadzyel is a city in Minsk Region, Belarus. It is the administrative centre of Myadzyel District. Myadzyel is located on the eastern shore of lake Miastra, one of the Narach lake group in Narachanski National Park.

History 
Within the Grand Duchy of Lithuania, Myadzyel was part of Vilnius Voivodeship. On February 8, 1659, the Battle of Myadel occurred near Myadzyel. In 1793, Myadzyel was acquired by the Russian Empire in the course of the Second Partition of Poland. In 1754 the Baroque Church of Saint Mary was by Antoniy Koshitz.

From 1921 until 1939, Myadzel (Miadzioł) was part of the Second Polish Republic. In September 1939, the town was occupied by the Red Army and, on 14 November 1939, incorporated into the Byelorussian SSR.

From 2 July 1941 until 4 July 1944, Myadzyel was occupied by Nazi Germany and administered as a part of the Generalbezirk Weißruthenien of Reichskommissariat Ostland.

References

External links 

Photos on Radzima.org

Myadzyel District
Populated places in Minsk Region
Towns in Belarus
Vileysky Uyezd
Vilnius Voivodeship
Wilno Voivodeship (1926–1939)